The Tibagi River (Portuguese, Rio Tibagi, also spelled Tibagy and Tibají) is a river of Paraná state in southern Brazil. It is a tributary of the Paranapanema River.

See also
 List of rivers of Paraná
 List of tributaries of the Río de la Plata

References

Brazilian Ministry of Transport

Rivers of Paraná (state)